Saint-Pierre is a town and commune of France's Caribbean overseas department of Martinique, founded in 1635 by Pierre Belain d'Esnambuc. Before the total destruction of Saint-Pierre by a volcanic eruption in 1902, it was the most important city of Martinique culturally and economically, being known as "the Paris of the Caribbean". While Fort-de-France was the official administrative capital, Saint-Pierre was the cultural capital of Martinique. After the disaster, Fort-de-France grew in economic importance.

History
Saint-Pierre was founded in 1635 by Pierre Belain d'Esnambuc, a French trader and adventurer, as the first permanent French colony on the island of Martinique.

Eruption of Mount Pelée

The town was again destroyed in 1902, when the volcano Mount Pelée erupted, killing 28,000 people. The entire population of the town, as well as people from neighboring villages who had taken refuge in the supposedly safe city, died, except for three people—a young girl, Havivra da Ifrile, a prisoner by the name of Louis-Auguste Cyparis (known also by various other names), who later toured the world with the Barnum and Bailey Circus, and Léon Compère-Léandre, who lived at the edge of the city.

Legend has it that the town's doom was forecast by loud groaning noises from within the volcano, but the mayor of the town had it blocked off to prevent people from leaving during an election.  This story appears to have originated with one of the island's newspapers, published by a political opponent of the governor.  Actually, there was considerable eruptive activity in the two weeks prior to the fatal blast, but since the phenomenon of the pyroclastic flow was not yet understood, the danger was perceived to be from lava flows, which, it was believed, would be stopped by two valleys between the volcano and the city.

Climate

Temperature record

Climate data of Saint-Pierre
Saint-Pierre has a tropical monsoon climate (Köppen climate classification Am).

Population

Today
The city of Saint-Pierre was never restored to its former entirety, though some villages were built in later decades on its place.

Today, the town is the seat of the Arrondissement of Saint-Pierre. It has been designated as a "City of Art and History". There are many historic remains, and a Volcanological Museum.

See also
Co-Cathedral of Our Lady of Assumption, Saint-Pierre
Communes of the Martinique department
Herculaneum
Pompeii
Victor Cochinat (1819–1886), French journalist
Georges Hébert (1875–1957), French naval officer who witnessed the destruction by the volcano on the island in 1902, and went on to develop a physical training method from his experience

References

External links

City of Saint-Pierre description from English edition of official Martinique website

Communes of Martinique
Subprefectures in France
Populated places in Martinique
Populated places established in 1635
1635 establishments in the French colonial empire